Kalagaudi is a Nepalese village. Kalagaudi is located in the Kanchanpur District of Sudurpashchim Province of Nepal. As of the 2021 census, the village had a population of roughly 7,000. 
This village is facilitated with one health post and one secondary school. Kalagaudi is geographically in the lap of nature surrounded with forest and a river . There are two rivers as well as five temples. Basically the residents here are Tharu people (both Rana tharus and Chaudharys) and people who migrated from hills of Bajhang, Baitadi, Darchula, Doti, Achham and Dadeldhura (Called Pahadis).There have been a large number of migrations in the past ten years. Bansaha is one of the village northern from Kalagaudi and Dekhatbhuli is another village eastern from Kalagaudi. District headquarter Mahendranagar is 27 kilometers far from here.

Populated places in Kanchanpur District